Laranjeiras (English: Orange trees) is a municipality located in the Brazilian state of Sergipe. Laranjeiras has a population density of 180 inhabitants per square kilometer. It borders the municipalities of Riachuelo, Areia Branca, Nossa Senhora do Socorro, São Cristóvão, Maruim, and Santo Amaro das Brotas, all within the state of Sergipe. The municipality contains part of the Serra de Itabaiana National Park.

History

Cristóvão de Barros killed or expelled the indigenous population of the Laranjeiras area around 1530. The Portuguese soon settled on the Cotinguiba River and built a small port, called the Porto de Laranjeiras, after numerous orange trees near the port. The port became a center of the slave trade in Sergipe as a result of its access to the interior and the Atlantic Ocean. The region was intensively attacked by the Dutch from 1637; they only left Sergipe in 1645. Most of the structures of the settlement were destroyed during the Dutch occupation, but the port was preserved. The Jesuits arrived in 1701 and built a church and convent in 1701; they later completed a church on a high point in the town, the Church of Our Lady of the Conception of Comandaroba in 1734. The economy of Laranjeiras expanded due to the slave trade and the production of sugar cane, cattle, and coconut. Plantation owners built sobrados, or large town houses, in Laranjeiras. Laranjeiras remained a district of Nossa Senhora do Socorro until 1832; it was elevated to city status in 1835.

Heritage sites

The architectural, urban and landscape set of Laranjeiras was listed by National Institute of Historic and Artistic Heritage in 1996. It consists of Portuguese colonial-era streets, churches, and residences, which in total includes approximately 500 buildings.

Parish Church of the Sacred Heart of Jesus (Igreja Matriz do Coração de Jesus)
Church of Our Lady of the Conception of Comandaroba (Igreja de Nossa Senhora da Conceição de Comandaroba)
Chapel of the Jesus Maria José Sugar Plantation (Capela do Antigo Engenho Jesus, Maria e José)
House and Chapel of the Retiro Sugar Plantation (Engenho Retiro: casa e Capela de Santo Antônio)
Terreiro Filhos de Obá
Grotto of Pedra Furada (Gruta da Pedra Furada)

References

Municipalities in Sergipe
Populated places established in 1832